Koléa is a city in Tipaza Province, northern Algeria, located approximately  southwest of Algiers. Its population in 2010 was 46,685.

History
Kolea was founded in 1550 by Hayreddin Barbarossa. In 1838, Lamoricère moved there with his regiment of Zouaves and built four forts: at Fouka, Tombourouf, Ben Azzouz, and Mokta-Khera.

References

External links
 Tageo.com entry

Communes of Tipaza Province
Tipaza Province